Salane is a small village located on the river Bubye in Mozambique.

Populated places in Gaza Province